Count Walter Butler was a member of the Butler family of Ormond who emigrated to Germany early in the 1600s with his brother, James. According to the Compendium of Irish Biography, both entered the Imperial service, and

See also

 Fridolin of Säckingen
 Kilian of Cologne
 Francis Stuart
 Jessica Kürten

External links
 http://www.libraryireland.com/biography/WalterButler.php

Irish soldiers
People from County Cork
17th-century Irish people
Irish emigrants to Germany
Walter
Wild Geese (soldiers)